Christian Gauss (1878 – 1951) was a literary critic and professor of literature.

Biography
Gauss was born in Ann Arbor, Michigan. His father had fled Württemberg when Prussia began to dominate it in the 1860s. The son graduated from the University of Michigan at 20, worked as a newspaper correspondent in Paris, covering the Dreyfus case during which time he met Oscar Wilde  who dedicated one of his poems to Gauss.

Later Gauss taught at Michigan and Lehigh University in the United States, and in 1905 became a first preceptor at Princeton University, where he remained until his retirement in 1946.

At Princeton, Gauss became a full professor of French Literature two years after his arrival; he was chairman of the department of modern languages; and he served as dean. After retiring from Princeton, he was president of Phi Beta Kappa. The academic society awards a Christian Gauss Award.

Though he was not a prolific author or a public figure, Gauss left a mark on literary scholarship: Princeton University's semiannual series of Christian Gauss Seminars in Criticism (founded in 1949 by R.P. Blackmur), and Phi Beta Kappa's annual Christian Gauss Award (est. 1950) for a book of literary criticism are named in his honor. Gauss influenced and corresponded frequently with F. Scott Fitzgerald and Edmund Wilson.

References

External sources

External links

 
 
 Gauss Award from Phi Beta Kappa
 Gauss Seminars from A Princeton Companion

1878 births
1951 deaths
American literary critics
Princeton University faculty
University of Michigan alumni
People from Ann Arbor, Michigan